The 2016 Eastleigh Borough Council election took place on 5 May 2016 to elect 15 members of Eastleigh Borough Council in England (approximately one third). This was on the same day as other local elections.

Ward results

Bishopstoke East

Bishopstoke West

Botley

Bursledon and Old Netley

1848

Chandlers Ford East

1436

Chandlers Ford West

Eastleigh Central

2491

Eastleigh North

Eastleigh South

2141

Fair Oak and Horton Heath

Hamble-Le-Rice and Butlocks Heath

1917

Hedge End St.Johns

2416

Hiltingbury East

Hiltingbury West

1722

Netley Abbey

1509

References

2016 English local elections
2016
2010s in Hampshire